is a Japanese manga series written and illustrated by Naoki Serizawa. It was adapted into a television drama in 2009 and a live action film in 2010.

A reboot series titled Saru Lock Reboot began serialization in Shonen Gahosha's Young King Bull magazine in October 2018. A spin-off manga series titled Saitō - Heaven's Crow Fūun Risshi was serialized in the same magazine from November 2020 to June 2021.

Plot
Yataro Sarumaru, nicknamed "Saru", is an average high school boy who daydreams about idols but otherwise has no luck with girls. While working with his father, a locksmith in Asakusa, Tokyo, he has gained exceptional skills to pick just about any lock. Using his exceptional skills, Yataro then finds himself solving various mysterious cases, while also trying his luck with the girls.

Adaptations

Television drama

Cast 
 Hayato Ichihara - Yataro Sarumaru (Saru)
 Sousuke Takaoka - Yamada Jiro
 Sei Ashina - Mizuhara Ritsuko
 Watabe Gota - Yamamoto Kenji

Live-action film

Plot 
Mayumi (Manami Higa) enlists the help of Yataro Sarumaru (Hayato Ichihara) to open a bank safe deposit box. This results in Yataro fleeing from the police who are in hot pursuit.

Cast 
Hayato Ichihara - Yataro Sarumaru (Saru) - is a “genius” locksmith who may have cool hands, but is in a perpetual lather, particularly about the opposite sex.
Manami Higa - Mayumi Shinozaki
Sousuke Takaoka - Yamada Jiro
Sei Ashina - Mizuhara Ritsuko
Watabe Gota - Yamamoto Kenji
Manami Konishi - Eiko Mizuki

Reception
By March 14, 2010, the film had made US$3,101,844 at the box office.

References

External links
 

2003 manga
2009 Japanese television series debuts
2009 Japanese television series endings
Japanese television dramas based on manga
Kodansha manga
Live-action films based on manga
Manga adapted into films
Television shows written by Yûichi Fukuda
Seinen manga
Shōnen Gahōsha manga
Yomiuri Telecasting Corporation original programming
Japanese comedy films